Guanglie may refer to:

Yin Lihua (5–64), posthumous name Empress Guanglie
An Lushan (703–757), posthumous name Emperor Guanglie